Eucalyptus pauciflora, commonly known as snow gum, cabbage gum or white sally, is a species of tree or mallee that is native to eastern Australia. It has smooth bark, lance-shaped to elliptical leaves, flower buds in clusters of between seven and fifteen, white flowers and cup-shaped, conical or hemispherical fruit. It is widespread and locally common in woodland in cold sites above  altitude.

Description
It has smooth white, grey or yellow bark that is shed in ribbons and sometimes has insect scribbles. Flowering occurs from October to February and the flowers are white.

Taxonomy 
Eucalyptus pauciflora was first formally described in 1827 by Kurt Polycarp Joachim Sprengel from an unpublished description by Franz Sieber. Sprengel published the description in Systema Vegetabilium. The specific epithet pauciflora is from the Latin pauciflorus meaning "few-flowered".  The term pauciflora (few-flowered) is a misnomer, and may originate in an early collected specimen losing its buds in transit.

Six subspecies are recognised by the Australian Plant Census as at 30 November 2019:
 Eucalyptus pauciflora subsp. acerina Rule occurs in Victoria;
 Eucalyptus pauciflora subsp. debeuzevillei (Maiden) L.A.S.Johnson & Blaxell in Victoria, New South Wales and the Australian Capital Territory;
 Eucalyptus pauciflora subsp. hedraia Rule in Victoria;
 Eucalyptus pauciflora subsp. niphophila (Maiden & Blakely) L.A.S.Johnson & Blaxell in New South Wales, the Australian Capital Territory and Victoria;
 Eucalyptus pauciflora subsp. parvifructa Rule in Victoria;
 Eucalyptus pauciflora Sieber ex Spreng. subsp. pauciflora is found in Queensland, New South Wales, the Australian Capital Territory, Victoria, South Australia and Tasmania.

Distribution and habitat
Snow gum grows in woodland along the ranges and tablelands, in flat, cold sites above  from the far south-east of Queensland, through New South Wales, the Australian Capital Territory, and Victoria, to near Mount Gambier in South Australia and Tasmania.

In Tasmania the species hybridises with Eucalyptus coccifera and Eucalyptus amygdalina.

Ecology
Snow gum is amongst the hardiest of all eucalyptus species, surviving the severe winter temperatures of the Australian Alps. The species regenerates from seed, by epicormic shoots below the bark, and from lignotubers. It has been introduced to Norway.

Influence on snowpack processes
Contrary to characteristics of needle-leaf forests, snow gums don't frequently intercept large quantities of snowfall on branches and leaves where it increased evaporation or sublimation can occur. As a result, snow accumulation is greater in living snow gum forests than burned forests or unforested areas.

Bushfire impact on snow gums alters these effects and leads to reduced snowpack longevity and greater evaporation/sublimation processes, in turn reducing snowpack runoff available for ecosystem and human use. It is estimated that the 2019-2020 bushfires impacted 462 km2 (33%) of mapped snow gum forest that regularly has seasonal snowpack, which would equate to a reduction in annual snowpack runoff of 63.3 gigalitres (about 25,320 olympic swimming pools).

Use in horticulture
In cultivation in the UK, Eucalyptus pauciflora subsp. niphophila and Eucalyptus pauciflora subsp.
debeuzevillei have gained the Royal Horticultural Society's Award of Garden Merit.

Gallery

References

Further reading
 Iglesias Trabado, Gustavo (2007). Eucalyptus from Alpine Australia. Notes on taxonomy and cultivation in cold temperate climates, In: EUCALYPTOLOGICS

External links
 Snow Gums: cold hardy
 Australian National Botanic Gardens
 Eucalypts for cold climates

pauciflora
Myrtales of Australia
Flora of the Australian Capital Territory
Flora of New South Wales
Flora of Queensland
Flora of Tasmania
Flora of Victoria (Australia)
Flora of South Australia
Trees of Australia
Trees of mild maritime climate
Plants described in 1827